The 1974–75 season was the first time Tennis Borussia Berlin played in the Fußball-Bundesliga, the highest tier of the German football league system. After 34 league games, Tennis Borussia finished in 17th position, second from the bottom of the table, only one place above Wuppertaler SV. The club reached the fourth round of the DFB-Pokal; eventually losing 2–1 away to VfB Stuttgart II. Thirteen of their 38 league goals were scored by striker Norbert Stolzenburg.

1974–75 Tennis Borussia Berlin squad

1974–75 fixtures

Player statistics

Final league position – 17th

References

External links 
 1974–75 Tennis Borussia Berlin season – squad and statistics at fussballdaten.de 

Tennis Borussia Berlin seasons
German football clubs 1974–75 season